George Ashfield (7 April 1934 – March 1985) was an English footballer.

Ashfield began his career with Stockport County without making any league appearances before going on to play 14 games in The Football League for top–flight side Aston Villa and Division Four club Chester in the late 1950s. After leaving Chester he dropped into Non-League football with Rhyl.

References

1934 births
1985 deaths
Footballers from Manchester
English Football League players
Association football fullbacks
English footballers
Stockport County F.C. players
Aston Villa F.C. players
Chester City F.C. players
Rhyl F.C. players